Lawrenceville is a Village municipality in the Le Val-Saint-François Regional County Municipality in the Estrie region of Quebec, Canada.

It is situated west of Sherbrooke, near the Black River.  Around 650 Lawrence villagers are counted in an area of 17 square kilometers.

History
The name of the village honors Mr. Henry Lawrence, son of Isaac Lawrence who originally came from Canaan, Connecticut, and moved to Shefford Township in 1794 settling his family near Lake Waterloo between Fulford and Waterloo. In 1800 the township of Stukely was created, and Henry and his brother Erastus became Samuel Willard's associates and both moved to South Stukely in 1804. Erastus died 8 years later. In 1836 Henry Lawrence moved to the northern part of Stukely and built a sawmill and flourmill on an island which became part of Lawrenceville. Although, the village of Lawrenceville was not constituted until 1905 by detachment of the municipality from the township of North-Stukely. Only remains of the building can still be found on Henry's Island, two dwellings still exist: dating from the 19th century, that is the Island Park House of Victorian style and another house, with a double-slope roof. Henry died in 1864, surviving his first wife Polly Day, daughter of Pelatiah and Hannah (Curtis) Day, and remarried to Elizabeth Lewis, daughter of the precursor of Waterloo, Captain Ezekiel Lewis and his wife Abigail Gibbs.

Demographics 

Mother tongue (2011)

See also
List of village municipalities in Quebec

References

External links

Villages in Quebec
Incorporated places in Estrie